Pawnee County is a county located in the U.S. state of Oklahoma. As of the 2010 census, the population was 16,577. Its county seat is Pawnee. The county is named after the Pawnee Nation, whose reservation used to encompass the county prior to allotment in 1893.

Pawnee County is included in the Tulsa, OK Metropolitan Statistical Area.

History
The Osage Nation used the area that contains present-day Pawnee County as buffalo hunting grounds. In 1825, The Osage ceded parts of present-day Missouri, Arkansas, and most of the future state of Oklahoma to the US federal government.

After their forced removal from the Southeastern United States, Cherokee people received land in Eastern Oklahoma as well as the Cherokee Outlet in 1828, which included present-day Pawnee County.  After the Civil War, the Cherokee agreed to allow other American Indians to settle in the eastern portion of the outlet. According to the Tribal Historic Preservation Office of the Pawnee Nation, the Pawnee people sold their Nebraska reservation in 1874 and used those funds to purchase land from the Cherokee Nation and the Muscogee Nation to establish a home in the Indian Territory.

From the Pawnee Nation Historic Preservation Office, the Pawnee people were forced to sign an agreement in 1891 to take land allotments from the reservation or have their lands taken from them by Imminent Domain. The remaining lands were opened to non-Indian settlers in 1893. Pawnee County was organized as County Q, and the future town of Pawnee, Townsite Number 13, was designated the county seat. In 1894, the voters chose the name Pawnee County over the name Platte County.

The female bandit, Little Britches, companion in crime with Cattle Annie, lived for a time at Sinnett, site of the Muscogee (Creek) Nation in Pawnee County.

Geography

The western third of the county is part of the Red Bed plains, while the remainder is in the Sandstone Hills region. The Cimarron and Arkansas Rivers drain the county. Black Bear Creek also extends through the county. Lone Chimney Lake dam is also in Pawnee County, while the lake extends into Payne County.

Adjacent counties
 Osage County (northeast)
 Tulsa County (southeast)
 Creek County (south)
 Payne County (southwest)
 Noble County (west)

Earthquake
A magnitude 5.8 earthquake struck near the city of Pawnee, just after 7 a.m. (CST) on September 3, 2016. This was Oklahoma's strongest quake in history, exceeding the 5.7-magnitude quake near Prague on November 5, 2011. Buildings in Pawnee were damaged, but there were no reports of deaths. A Pawnee resident was injured while shielding his child from debris falling from a chimney. State regulators in Oklahoma ordered 37 petroleum production wastewater disposal wells in the vicinity of the earthquake (see map in citation) to be rapidly closed while assessments were made.

Demographics

As of the census of 2000, there were 16,612 people, 6,383 households, and 4,748 families residing in the county.  The population density was 11/km2 (29/mi2).  There were 7,464 housing units at an average density of 5/km2 (13/mi2).  The racial makeup of the county was 82.27% White, 0.69% Black or African American, 12.13% Native American, 0.20% Asian, 0.05% Pacific Islander, 0.24% from other races, and 4.42% from two or more races.  1.16% of the population were Hispanic or Latino of any race.

There were 6,383 households, out of which 32.60% had children under the age of 18 living with them, 61.60% were married couples living together, 9.00% had a female householder with no husband present, and 25.60% were non-families. 22.80% of all households were made up of individuals, and 11.00% had someone living alone who was 65 years of age or older.  The average household size was 2.58 and the average family size was 3.02.

In the county, the population was spread out, with 26.50% under the age of 18, 7.30% from 18 to 24, 26.20% from 25 to 44, 25.20% from 45 to 64, and 14.80% who were 65 years of age or older.  The median age was 38 years. For every 100 females, there were 97.40 males.  For every 100 females age 18 and over, there were 94.40 males.

The median income for a household in the county was $31,661, and the median income for a family was $37,274. Males had a median income of $29,946 versus $21,069 for females. The per capita income for the county was $15,261.  About 9.60% of families and 13.00% of the population were below the poverty line, including 16.60% of those under age 18 and 13.80% of those age 65 or over.

Politics

Communities

 Blackburn
 Cleveland
 Hallett
 Jennings
 Maramec
 Mule Barn
 Oak Grove
 Pawnee (county seat)
 Quay
 Ralston
 Shady Grove
 Skedee
 Terlton
 Westport

NRHP sites

The following sites in Pawnee County are listed on the National Register of Historic Places:

 Arkansas Valley National Bank, Pawnee
 Blackburn Methodist Church, Blackburn
 Blue Hawk Peak Ranch, Pawnee
 Corliss Steam Engine, Pawnee
 First State Bank of Maramec, Maramec
 Mullendore Mansion, Cleveland
 Pawnee Agency and Boarding School Historic District, Pawnee
 Pawnee Armory, Pawnee
 Pawnee County Courthouse, Pawnee
 Pawnee Indian Agency, Pawnee
 Pawnee Municipal Swimming Pool and Bathhouse, Pawnee
 Ralston Opera House, Ralston

References

 
Tulsa metropolitan area
1893 establishments in Oklahoma Territory
Populated places established in 1893